Zvi Moisescu (13 September 1939 - 4 January 2013) was a  Romanian-Israeli footballer who played as a defender.

International career
Zvi Moisescu played six games at international level for Israel. Three games were at the 1960 Asian Cup, and two at the 1962 World Cup qualifiers. He also appeared twice for Israel's Olympic team at the 1960 Summer Olympics qualifiers.

Honours
Maccabi Netanya
Second Division: 1963–64
Israel
 AFC Asian Cup runner-up: 1960

Notes

References

1939 births
2013 deaths
Association football defenders
Israeli footballers
Israel international footballers
Jewish footballers
Romanian Jews
Jewish Romanian sportspeople
Israeli people of Romanian-Jewish descent
1960 AFC Asian Cup players
Maccabi Netanya F.C. players
Liga Leumit players
People from Sinaia